Morad Fareed (born September 14, 1979) is a New York-based entrepreneur and former professional athlete.

Career
Born in New York State, Fareed was a member of the first Palestine national football team in its attempt to qualify for the 2006 FIFA World Cup. Although Palestine did not qualify for the World Cup, Fareed appeared in one preliminary match against Iraq on 16 November 2004.

He was featured in the 2006 film Goal Dreams, a documentary directed by Maya Sanbar and Jeffrey Saunders that follows the Palestinian national team in their attempt to qualify for the World Cup.

References

Living people
1979 births
Palestinian footballers
American people of Palestinian descent
Association football midfielders
Palestine international footballers
Palestinian expatriate footballers
Expatriate soccer players in the United States
Palestinian businesspeople